20th Century Masters – The Millennium Collection: The Best of Michael Jackson is a compilation album by American singer and recording artist Michael Jackson. It was released on November 21, 2000, by Motown Records. It was released as part of the 20th Century Masters – The Millennium Collections series. It features Jackson's early solo recordings from 1971 until 1975, including the hit records "Got to Be There", "Ben", and "Rockin' Robin". The album was re-released on March 6, 2012 as Icon'''. Icon'' is the ninth album to be released by Sony and Motown/Universal since Jackson's death in June 2009.

Reception
Stephen Thomas Erlewine said the album "doesn't contain every single one of his early solo hits, but it does contain the great majority of them, which means it might satisfy the tastes of many listeners who just want a sampling of the best of this era".

Track listing
 "Got to Be There" (from Got to Be There) (Elliot Willensky)- 3:23
 "I Wanna Be Where You Are" (from Got to Be There) (Leon Ware/T-Boy Ross) - 2:57
 "Rockin' Robin" (from Got to Be There) (Jesse Thomas) - 2:31
 "People Make the World Go 'Round" (from Ben) (Linda Creed/Thom Bell) - 3:13
 "With a Child's Heart" (from Music And Me) (Henry Cosby/Sylvia May/Vicky Basemore) - 3:34
 "Happy" (Love Theme from Lady Sings the Blues) (from Music And Me) (Henry Cosby/Sylvia May/Vicky Basemore) - 3:25
 "Ben" (from Ben) (Don Black/Walter Scharf) - 2:44
 "We're Almost There" (from Forever, Michael) (Brian Holland/Eddie Holland Jr.) - 3:43
 "Just a Little Bit of You" (from Forever, Michael) (Brian Holland/Eddie Holland Jr.) - 3:12
 "One Day in Your Life" (from Forever, Michael) (Renee Armand/Sam Brown) - 4:16
 "Music and Me" (from Music And Me) (Don Fenceton/Jerry Marcellino/Mel Larson/Mike Cannon) - 2:38

References

2000 compilation albums
Michael Jackson compilation albums
Jackson, Michael
Motown compilation albums
Albums produced by Brian Holland
Albums produced by the Corporation (record production team)
Albums produced by Bob Gaudio